Belgium competed at the 1936 Summer Olympics in Berlin, Germany. 150 competitors, 145 men and 5 women, participated in 72 events in 15 sports.

Medalists

Bronze
 Auguste Garrebeek, Armand Putzeys, and François Vandermotte — Cycling, Men's Team Road Race
 Henri Disy, Pierre Coppieters, Albert Castelyns, Gérard Blitz, Fernand Isselé, Joseph De Combe, Henri Stoelen, Henri De Pauw and Edmond Michiels — Water polo, Men's Team Competition

Athletics

Basketball

Boxing

Canoeing

Cycling

Eight cyclists, all male, represented Belgium in 1936.

Individual road race
 Auguste Garrebeek
 Armand Putzeyse
 Jean-François Van Der Motte
 Jef Lowagie

Team road race
 Auguste Garrebeek
 Armand Putzeyse
 Jean-François Van Der Motte
 Jef Lowagie

Sprint
 Henri Collard

Time trial
 Frans Cools

Tandem
 Frans Cools
 Roger Pirotte

Team pursuit
 Jean Alexandre
 Frans Cools
 Auguste Garrebeek
 Armand Putzeyse

Equestrian

Fencing

20 fencers, 17 men and 3 women, represented Belgium in 1936.

Men's foil
 Raymond Bru
 Georges de Bourguignon
 Paul Valcke

Men's team foil
 Georges de Bourguignon, André Van De Werve De Vorsselaer, Henri Paternóster, Raymond Bru, Jean Heeremans, Paul Valcke

Men's épée
 Charles Debeur
 Raymond Stasse
 Hervé du Monceau de Bergendael

Men's team épée
 Raymond Stasse, Robert T'Sas, Charles Debeur, Hervé du Monceau de Bergendael, Jean Plumier, Marcel Heim

Men's sabre
 Robert Van Den Neucker
 Eugène Laermans
 Georges Heywaert

Men's team sabre
 Eugène Laermans, Georges Heywaert, Robert Van Den Neucker, Henri Brasseur, Hubert Van Nerom

Women's foil
 Jenny Addams
 Madeleine Scrève
 Adèle Christiaens

Field hockey

Gymnastics

Modern pentathlon

Three male pentathletes represented Belgium in 1936.

 Édouard Écuyer de le Court
 Raoul Mollet
 Jan Scheere

Rowing

Belgium had seven rowers participate in two out of seven rowing events in 1936.

 Men's coxless pair
 Frans Thissen
 Edmond Van Herck

 Men's coxed four
 René Vingerhoet
 Paul Siebels
 Willy Collet
 Jean De Rode
 Harry Peeters (cox)

Sailing

Shooting

Three shooters represented Belgium in 1936.

25 m rapid fire pistol
 Marcel Lafortune
 François Lafortune

50 m pistol
 Marcel Lafortune
 Paul Van Asbroeck
 François Lafortune

50 m rifle, prone
 François Lafortune
 Paul Van Asbroeck
 Marcel Lafortune

Water polo

Wrestling

Art competitions

References

External links
Official Olympic Reports
International Olympic Committee results database

Nations at the 1936 Summer Olympics
1936
Olympics